Courtney Alister Meppen-Walter (born 2 August 1994) is an English professional footballer who plays for Guiseley on loan from Radcliffe as a defender. He previously played for Carlisle United.

Career
Meppen-Walter began his career with Manchester City; he was released from the club after being found guilty of causing death by careless driving. In November 2013, after being released from prison, he joined Carlisle United on trial, and later that month he signed an initial one-month contract with the club. in December 2013, manager Graham Kavanagh announced that Meppen-Walter would be considered for the club's next game in the FA Cup, where he made his senior debut. On 14 December, Meppen-Walter signed a two-and-a-half-year contract keeping him with the Cumbrian outfit until the summer of 2016. Meppen-Walter made his senior league debut later on the same day against Tranmere Rovers, a 4–1 win at Brunton Park. He left the club in November 2015.

Meppen-Walter signed for Conference North club, Chorley in March 2016.

Meppen-Walter signed for Conference North club, AFC Telford United in June 2020. 

After just one season with Telford, Meppen-Walter joined Radcliffe in August 2021. On 26 December 2022, he joined Guiseley on loan.

International career
Meppen-Walter played for England at under-17 and under-18 levels.

References

External links

1994 births
Living people
Footballers from Bury, Greater Manchester
English footballers
Association football defenders
England youth international footballers
Black British sportspeople
Manchester City F.C. players
Carlisle United F.C. players
Chorley F.C. players
Ashton United F.C. players
Stockport County F.C. players
AFC Telford United players
Radcliffe F.C. players
Guiseley A.F.C. players
English Football League players
National League (English football) players
Northern Premier League players
English prisoners and detainees